Tapinoma antarcticum is a species of ant in the genus Tapinoma. Described by Forel in 1904, the species is endemic to Chile.

References

Tapinoma
Hymenoptera of South America
Insects described in 1904
Endemic fauna of Chile